James Christopher Perry (born September 27, 1961) is an American professional golfer. He has been featured in the top 50 of the Official World Golf Ranking.

Amateur career
Perry was born in Edenton, North Carolina. He was the Minnesota high school golf champion in 1978, 1979 and 1980. Perry attended the Ohio State University, where he was a three-time All-America selection. He finished runner-up in the 1983 U.S. Amateur. Perry was named Collegiate Player of the Year in 1984. He also captured the 1983 Big Ten Championship. He won the 1982 and 1983 Minnesota State Amateur and 1984 Minnesota State Open.

Professional career
Perry turned pro in 1984. He played on the PGA Tour from 1985 to 1992. He split time between the PGA Tour and the Nike Tour in 1993, and played on the Nike Tour full-time in 1994. In 1994 he was named the Nike Tour Player of the Year and also led the money list. He won the Nike Utah Classic on the Nike Tour in 1994 and the 1994 Mexican Open. He then played on the PGA Tour from 1995 to 2001. He won the B.C. Open in 1998, his only PGA Tour victory. 1999 was Perry's best year on tour; he earned $2,145,707 and finished fifth on the money list. He recorded two runner-up finishes, and his 14 top-10 finishes were second only to Tiger Woods' 16. He cracked the top 50 of the Official World Golf Rankings due to his successful year.

Perry suffered left hand and wrist injuries at the 2001 Open Championship, causing him to play in only a few events in 2002. He was granted a major medical extension for 2003 but was still too injured to play on tour regularly. He received a second major medical extension for 2004 but only played in one event. He had surgery for a pinched nerve in his elbow in February 2004 and was told by his doctor that it would take 18 months to two years to fully recover. He has been granted medical extensions every year since 2003 but has played in very few events due to the injuries. He has not played in a PGA Tour event since 2006.

Personal life
Perry also played baseball and hockey while growing up. He was captain of the Edina-West High School hockey team during the 1979–80 season.

Perry's father, Jim, pitched in Major League Baseball and won 215 games and was the 1970 American League Cy Young Award winner. His uncle Gaylord Perry also pitched in MLB, was a winner of 315 games and is a member of the Baseball Hall of Fame.

Perry was inducted into the Ohio State Varsity O Hall of Fame in 1993.

Amateur wins
this list may be incomplete
1982 Northeast Amateur
1982 Minnesota State Amateur
1983 Minnesota State Amateur

Professional wins (4)

PGA Tour wins (1)

Nike Tour wins (1)

Nike Tour playoff record (0–1)

Other wins (2)
1984 Minnesota State Open (as an amateur)
1994 Mexican Open

Results in major championships

CUT = missed the half-way cut
WD = Withdrew
"T" = tied

Summary

Most consecutive cuts made – 8 (1997 PGA – 2000 U.S. Open)
Longest streak of top-10s – 1

Results in The Players Championship

CUT = missed the halfway cut
"T" indicates a tie for a place

Results in World Golf Championships

1Cancelled due to 9/11

QF, R16, R32, R64 = Round in which player lost in match play
"T" = Tied
NT = No tournament

See also
1984 PGA Tour Qualifying School graduates
1994 Nike Tour graduates

References

External links

American male golfers
Ohio State Buckeyes men's golfers
PGA Tour golfers
Korn Ferry Tour graduates
Golfers from North Carolina
Golfers from Minnesota
Golfers from Ohio
People from Edenton, North Carolina
People from Powell, Ohio
1961 births
Living people